Erts is a village in Andorra, located in the parish of La Massana. 

Populated places in Andorra
La Massana